Fishing owls form the genus, Scotopelia, of sub-Saharan African birds in the family Strigidae, the true owls. The genus is closely related to the  genus Ketupa, and may be embedded within it.

The genus contains three species:
 Vermiculated fishing owl (S. bouvieri)
 Pel's fishing owl (S. peli)
 Rufous fishing owl (S. ussheri)

References

Strigidae
Scotopelia
Taxa named by Charles Lucien Bonaparte
Taxonomy articles created by Polbot